Val Fernandes is a retired Brazilian-American soccer defender who played professionally in the North American Soccer League, Major Indoor Soccer League and Western Soccer League.

Fernandes attended Azusa Pacific University, playing on the men's soccer team from 1977 to 1980.  He was inducted in the school's Athletic Hall of Fame in 1992.  In 1981, Fernandes played two games for the California Surf before being released.  He spent a year not playing, then was signed by the San Diego Sockers in 1983.  He played only one game before being waived, but was picked up by the Tulsa Roughnecks and won the 1983 NASL championship with them.  In 1984, he moved to the Major Indoor Soccer League where he played two seasons, one with the Chicago Sting and the other with the Los Angeles Lazers.  In 1989, he played for the California Kickers of the Western Soccer Alliance.

References

External links
 NASL/MISL stats

1958 births
Living people
Azusa Pacific Cougars men's soccer players
Brazilian emigrants to the United States
American soccer players
American sportspeople of Brazilian descent
California Kickers players
California Surf players
Chicago Sting (MISL) players
Los Angeles Lazers players
Major Indoor Soccer League (1978–1992) players
North American Soccer League (1968–1984) indoor players
North American Soccer League (1968–1984) players
San Diego Sockers (NASL) players
Tulsa Roughnecks (1978–1984) players
Western Soccer Alliance players
Association football midfielders
Association football defenders
Brazilian American